Great Wave Software was an educational computer software company founded in 1984 by Dr. Chad Mitchell and Stacy Mitchell and was located in Scotts Valley, California. It was a division of Instructional Fair Group, which was based in Grand Rapids, Michigan, and was a Tribune Education company.

Products produced by Great Wave included:

NumberMaze
NumberMaze Challenge
ReadingMaze
KidsMath 
KidsTime Deluxe
Reading Mansion
World Discovery Deluxe
World Discovery
ConcertWare
Prairie Explorer: Biomes of North America (Eddie Award Winner)
Redwoods Explorer: Biomes of North America
Axel's Whirled Math
DaisyQuest & Daisy's Castle

McGraw-Hill Children's Publishing (now part of School Specialty Publishing) bought Great Wave Software, and the company no longer exists. All of Great Wave Software's products are out of print. School Specialty Publishing was later bought by Carson Dellosa publishing.

References

External links
 Great Wave Software(archive)

Defunct educational software companies
Defunct software companies of the United States
Software companies based in the San Francisco Bay Area
Companies based in Santa Cruz County, California
Software companies established in 1984
1984 establishments in California
Defunct companies based in the San Francisco Bay Area